Idrettslaget Valder is a Norwegian sports club from Valderøy, Giske, Møre og Romsdal. It has sections for association football, team handball and track and field.

It was founded on 25 August 1956.

The men's football team currently plays in the 4th Division, the fifth tier of Norwegian football. Former players include Svein Ola Egseth, Andre Ulla, Kenneth Giske, Erlend Holm and Henrik Bjørdal

Current squad

Recent history

References

Official site 

Football clubs in Norway
Association football clubs established in 1956
Sport in Møre og Romsdal
Athletics clubs in Norway
1956 establishments in Norway